Ponerorchis tominagae is a species of flowering plant in the family Orchidaceae, native to Taiwan.

Taxonomy
The species was first described by Bunzō Hayata in 1916 as Gymnadenia tominagae. Hayata stated that the plant he described was collected by T. Tominaga. He spelt the specific epithet as "tominagai", and this spelling has been used by some subsequent authors when transferring the species to a different genus. However, the International Code of Nomenclature for algae, fungi, and plants requires names not published in a form specified by the code to be corrected to conform to it, and personal names ending in "-a", even if the person is a man, should have an epithet in the genitive case formed by adding "-e". The epithet is thus correctly spelt "tominagae".

The species has been transferred to several genera: to Amitostigma (now included in Ponerorchis), to Orchis, and in 2000, to Ponerorchis. Several other species have been brought into synonymy with Ponerorchis tominagae.

References

tominagae
Flora of Taiwan
Plants described in 1916